Bivincula watsoni is a moth in the family Bombycidae. It was described by Wolfgang Dierl in 1978. It is found in Sikkim, India.

The wingspan is about 32 mm. The ground colour is white with grey markings.

References

Bombycidae
Moths described in 1978